A battleship is a large, heavily armored warship.

Battleship may also refer to:

Geography
 Battleship, West Virginia, a community in the United States
 Battleship Cove, a maritime museum in Massachusetts, US
 Battleship (Antarctica), a massif

Games
 Battleship (game), a guessing game for two players
 Battleship (puzzle), a logic puzzle based on the game
 Battleships (video game), a 1987 computer video game based on the original game
 Battleship (1993 video game), a NES and Sega Game Gear video game by Mindscape
 Battleship (1996 video game), a PC video game by Hasbro Interactive
Battleship: Surface Thunder, a 2000 PC video game based on the original game
 Battleship (2012 video game), a game based on the 2012 Battleship film

Music
 "Battleships" (song), a song by Daughtry
"Battleship", a song by Red Hot Chili Peppers from Freaky Styley

Other
 Battleship (film), a 2012 science fiction action film
 Battleship (horse), an American thoroughbred racehorse
 Battleship (rocketry), a non-functional rocket or rocket stage used to test a launch vehicle